W14 may refer to:

 Cierva W.14 Skeeter 1 & 2, variants of the Saunders-Roe Skeeter two-seat training and scout helicopter
Mercedes W14, a Formula One car
 W14, a bus route in London
 W14, a Metrobus route in Washington, D.C.
 W14, a postcode district in the W postcode area